Kathinka Heinefetter, also Cathinka Heinefetter (12 September 1819  – 20 December 1858) was a German operatic soprano.

Life 
Heinefetter was born into a poor Jewish family in Mainz and was one of five Heinefetter sisters, all of whom were able to develop stage careers. Kathinka received her vocal training from her older sister Sabine. In 1837, she made her debut at the Frankfurt Opera as Agathe in the opera Der Freischütz by Carl Maria von Weber. In 1840, she had significant success at the Paris Opera.

In 1842, she received an engagement at the Brussels La Monnaie. It was there, on the night of 20/21 November 1842, that the once much-discussed tragic incident occurred. In her flat, the Parisian lawyer Eduard Caumartin stabbed his colleague and rival, Count Aimé Sirey, with a rapier. After this scandal, she left the Belgian metropolis.

From 1850, she sang again at the Paris Opéra, then at the opera houses in Hamburg, Berlin, Vienna and Budapest. Her major roles included the title role in Norma by Vincenzo Bellini, Rachel in La Juive by Jacques Fromental Halévy, Valentine in Les Huguenots by Giacomo Meyerbeer and Agathe in Carl Maria von Weber's Der Freischütz.

Heinefetter retired from the stage in 1858 and settled in Freiburg im Breisgau, where she died of heart disease in December at the age of 39.

In memory 
In April 2016, the square in front of the Staatstheater Mainz was renamed "Geschwister-Heinefetter-Platz".

References

Further reading 
 Heinefetter, Kathinka, Sängerin. In Walther Killy, Rudolf Vierhaus (ed.): Deutsche Biographische Enzyklopädie (DBE). 1st edition. Vol. 4: Gies–Hessel. K. G. Saur Verlag, Munich 1996, .
 
  Heinefetter, Schwestern on OeML. Online-Edition, Vienna 2002 ff., ; Print edition: Vol. 2, publication of the Österreichischen Akademie der Wissenschaften Wienna 2003, .

External links 

 
 Heinefetter, Kathinka on BMLO
 Heinefetter Kathinka on Operissimo

German operatic sopranos
1819 births
1858 deaths
Musicians from Mainz